Tejaa is an Indian Hindi-language action film directed by Ramesh Puri and produced by Mahendra Bohra. It stars Sanjay Dutt and Kimi Katkar in main roles. film was an above average at the box office.

Plot
Lal Singh, Heeralal Ghosh, and Zoravar rob the gold vault of a bank, take off with all the gold bars they can carry, and bury it deep in the countryside. Several weeks later, they return to share the bars between them but find them gone. Suspecting a nearby family of having stolen them, they kill the husband; wife, Shanti; hang the young son, and abscond upon hearing people coming to investigate this commotion. Twenty years later, a man named Tejaa meets with Lal Singh, and kills him. Then Tejaa meets with Heeralal, befriends him, and then subsequently kills him. When Zoravar finds out that he could be Tejaa's next victim, he starts to take all possible precautions from this assailant, as well as lay an elaborate trap and ensure that they avenge their former partners and father respectively.

Cast

 Sanjay Dutt as Tejaa / Sanjay
 Karanvir Bohra as Young Teja
 Kimi Katkar as Sonu
 Sonu Walia as Heena 
 Amrish Puri as Zoravar
 Ranjeet as Lal Singh
 Puneet Issar as Heeralal
 Beena Banerjee as Shanti (Tejaa's mother)
 Surendra Pal as Tejaa's father
Viju Khote as Police Inspector, Special appearance 
Firoz Irani as Zoravar Henchman

Songs
"Aage Aage Jaye Mera Dil" - Asha Bhosle
"Ambua Ka Pedh Hai" - Anuradha Paudwal
"Mera Chrcha Mumbai Se" - Kavita Krishnamurthy
"Een Meen Een Meen" - Alka Yagnik

References

External links

1990s Hindi-language films
1990 films
Films scored by Anu Malik
Indian action drama films
Indian films about revenge
1990s action drama films